Miss America's Outstanding Teen 2011 was the 6th Miss America's Outstanding Teen pageant held at the Linda Chapin Theatre in the Orange County Convention Center in Orlando, Florida on July 29th, 2017. Jeanette Morelan of Wisconsin crowned her successor Lacey Russ of Oklahoma at the end of the event. This was the first time that Miss Oklahoma's Outstanding Teen captured the title of Miss America's Outstanding Teen. Miss America 2010 Caressa Cameron hosted the pageant.

Results

Other Awards

Contestants

References

2011
2011 beauty pageants
2011 in Florida